Robert G. Wright is a Canadian former diplomat.

He held the position of Deputy Minister of International Trade from 1995 until he was appointed Canadian Ambassador to Japan in 2001. He served in this position until 2005 when he was appointed as Ambassador to People's Republic of China, a position he held until 2009. While in China, he was also accredited as Canadian Ambassador to Mongolia.

Born in Montreal, he is the brother of James R. Wright and David Wright, who are both also retired diplomats. They served most recently as Canada's high commissioner to the United Kingdom from 2006 to 2011 and as Canada's permanent representative to the North Atlantic Treaty Organization from 1997 to 2003, respectively.

Robert G. Wright currently sits on the advisory council of the Canadian Defence and Foreign Affairs Institute based in Calgary. He is a senior research fellow for the China Institute.

See also
List of Canadian ambassadors to China
List of Canadian ambassadors to Japan

References

External links
 Government of Canada - Ambassador's Biography

Ambassadors of Canada to China
Year of birth missing (living people)
Living people
Place of birth missing (living people)
Ambassadors of Canada to Japan